The 1977 Auckland City mayoral election was part of the New Zealand local elections held that same year. In 1977, elections were held for the Mayor of Auckland plus other local government positions including twenty-one city councillors. The polling was conducted using the standard first-past-the-post electoral method.

Background
Incumbent Mayor Dove-Myer Robinson was re-elected seeing off a challenges from Labour Party candidate Jim Anderton, former councillor Colin Kay and Citizens & Ratepayers nominee Mel Tronson.

Mayoralty results

Councillor results

References

Mayoral elections in Auckland
1977 elections in New Zealand
Politics of the Auckland Region
1970s in Auckland
October 1977 events in New Zealand